David Andrew Whiten, known as Andrew Whiten (born 1948) is a British zoologist and psychologist, Professor of Evolutionary and Developmental Psychology, and Professor Wardlaw Emeritus at University of St Andrews in Scotland. He is known for his research in social cognition, specifically on social learning, tradition and the evolution of culture, social Machiavellian intelligence, autism and imitation, as well as the behavioral ecology of sociality. In 1996, Whiten and his colleagues invented an artificial fruit that allowed to study learning in apes and humans.

Personal life and education
Whiten was born in 1948 in Grimsby, England. He graduated with a degree in zoology from the University of Sheffield and achieved a PhD in Psychology at the University of Bristol.

Career
Whiten started reading and lecturing at the University of St Andrews in 1970, joined the Department of Psychology in St Andrews in 1975, and became professor of evolutionary and developmental psychology in 1997. Whiten was co-founder of the Scottish Primate Research Group. In 2003, he founded the Centre for Social Learning and Cultural Evolution at the University of St Andrews. He also was founder and first director of the primate research center Living Links to Human Evolution (short: Living Links) that opened 2008 in Edinburgh Zoo and draws more than 250,000 visitors per year.

Research
Whiten is a pioneer in the study of cultural evolution in chimpanzees and other primates, studying them for decades.  He has demonstrated the existent of traditions in primate culture in areas such as foraging, tool use and courtship. He has also shown that it is possible to introduce new traditions, by teaching primates in different groups different methods for getting a treat from a box. The first two chimps taught others, who almost always learned the method used first in their group. In another study, vervet monkeys which had learned to avoid grains of corn of a particular color (flavored by a bitter taste) relearned their color preferences for food once they became part of another group with different preferences.  Such “transmission chain” studies have shown cultural learning between individuals in at least 20 different species. The ability to learn from others is particularly important for adaptability under changing conditions such as climate change.

Fellowships
Whiten is member of the following learned societies:
 British Academy since 2000
 British Psychological Society since 2000
 Royal Society of Edinburgh since 2001
 Cognitive Science Society since 2013

He was member of the Editorial Board of the Philosophical Transactions of the Royal Society, Biological Sciences, from 2008 to 2013. He additionally chaired the Research Awards Committee of the British Academy from 2011 to 2013.

Awards and honors
Whiten was awarded the Delwart International Scientific Prize by the Royal Academies for Science and the Arts of Belgium in 2001, the Rivers Memorial Medal of the Royal Anthropological Institute (RAI), and the Osman Hill Medal of the Primate Society of Great Britain in 2007. He is the first and only scientist who was awarded both, the Sir James Black Medal (in 2014) and the Senior Prize and Medal for Public Engagement (in 2015) by the Royal Society of Edinburgh.

He was awarded an honorary doctor of the Heriot-Watt University in Edinburgh in 2015, of the University of Stirling in 2016, and of the University of Edinburgh in 2016/2017.

References

Selected works
 
 
 
 
 
 
 
 
 A. Whiten, Richard W. Byrne (ed.): Machiavellian intelligence. Social expertise and the evolution of intellect in monkeys, apes, and humans, 1988.

External links
Andrew Whiten at the University of St Andrews
 Andrew Whiten at the British Academy
 Andrew Whiten at ResearchGate
 

1948 births
Living people
British psychologists
British zoologists
Fellows of the Cognitive Science Society
Fellows of the British Academy
Fellows of the Royal Society of Edinburgh
Fellows of the British Psychological Society